The 1922 Saxony state election was held on 5 November 1922 to elect the 96 members of the Landtag of Saxony.

Results

References 

Saxony
Elections in Saxony
November 1922 events in Europe